Piasecki (feminine: Piasecka, plural: Piaseccy) is a Polish family name and may refer to one of the following.

 Anna Piasecka (1882–1980), Polish politician
 Barbara Piasecka Johnson (1937–2013), Polish-American philanthropist and art collector
 Bartosz Piasecki (born 1984), Norwegian fencer
 Bolesław Piasecki (1915–1979), Polish politician
 Edyta Piasecka, Polish soprano
 Fabian Piasecki (born 1995), Polish footballer
 Francis Piasecki (1951–2018), French footballer
 Frank Piasecki (1919–2008), American engineer and founder of two aviation businesses:
 Piasecki Helicopter
 Piasecki Aircraft
 Jess Piasecki, British long-distance runner
 Lech Piasecki (born 1961), Polish cyclist
 Sergiusz Piasecki (1901–1964), Polish writer
 Stanisław Piasecki (1900–1941), Polish right-wing activist, politician and journalist
 Zofia Posmysz-Piasecka (born 1923), Polish writer
  (1893–1954), Polish general, recipient of Virtuti Militari order

See also
 
 

Polish-language surnames